The 2019 Ashleigh Barty tennis season officially began on 7 January 2019 as the start of the 2019 WTA Tour. Ashleigh Barty entered the season as world number 15 in singles and finished as world number 1. The season saw Barty won her first single's major at the French Open.

All matches

Singles matches

Doubles matches

Tournament schedule

Singles schedule

Doubles schedule

Yearly records

Top 10 wins

Singles

Doubles

Finals

Singles: 6 (4 titles, 2 runner-ups)

Doubles: 2 (1 title, 1 runner-up)

Earnings

References

External links

 
 
 
 

2019 in Australian tennis
2019 tennis player seasons
Ashleigh Barty tennis seasons